The Wales national football team represents Wales in international association football and is governed by the Football Association of Wales. The team are the third oldest in international football, behind only Scotland and England and played their first match on 18 March 1876, a 4–0 defeat to Scotland at Hamilton Crescent in Glasgow. Wales played their first home fixture the following year, which Scotland won 2–0 at the Racecourse Ground in Wrexham. Wales met England for the first time in 1879 and recorded their first victory against them two years later, winning 1–0 at Alexandra Meadows following a goal from John Vaughan. In 1882, Wales played Ireland for the first time, defeating them 7–1 at the Racecourse. 

With all four Home Nations playing annual friendly matches, the decision was taken to organise the fixtures into a competition. The British Home Championship, a round-robin tournament, was subsequently formed and the inaugural season was held in 1884. Wales won their opening fixture 6–0 against Ireland but defeats against England and Scotland in their remaining matches led to a third place finish. In 1888, Wales recorded the largest victory in the team's history by defeating Ireland 11–0; Jack Doughty scored four of his side's goals. It was not until 1895 that Wales finished higher than third in the Championship, claiming a second place finish after drawing all three fixtures.

From the nation's first fixture in 1876 to the end of the century Wales played 63 fixtures, winning 11, drawing 8 and losing the remaining 44. Of the side's victories, 9 were secured over Ireland and 2 over England, while they failed to defeat Scotland in 24 attempts during this period. The team's struggles were exacerbated by the reluctance of clubs in the Football League to release Welsh players for international fixtures, which often clashed with league matches. In the 1890s, Wales finished bottom of the British Home Championship in six of the ten tournaments held and lost nine of their final ten matches in the decade.

Results
Wales' score is shown first in each case. The colours listed below are also used to signify results combined with the scoreline.

Head to head records

Notes

References 
Statistics
 
 
 

Bibliography

Specific

1870s in Wales
1880s in Wales
1890s in Wales
1800s